Mariam Kromah (born January 1, 1994) is a Liberian sprinter. She competed at the 2016 Summer Olympics in the women's 400 metres race; her time of 52.79 seconds in the heats did not qualify her for the semifinals.

Early years
Mariam Kromah was born in Liberia on 01 January 1994, she started her sports career in track and field athletics.

Early competitions
Mariam Kromah attended University of Southern Mississippi and was part of the university track and field team. She holds Southern Miss outdoor record in the 400 meters.

Personal bests

International competitions

References

1994 births
Living people
Liberian female sprinters
Sportspeople from Monrovia
Olympic athletes of Liberia
Athletes (track and field) at the 2016 Summer Olympics
Place of birth missing (living people)
Olympic female sprinters